Jeong Ji-yun (born 1 January 2001) is a South Korean volleyball player. She is part of the South Korea women's national volleyball team.

She participated in the 2017 FIVB Volleyball Girls' U18 World Championship, and 2019 FIVB Volleyball Women's Nations League.

On the club level she is playing for Hyundai E&C. She is part of the South Korea women's national volleyball team roster for the Summer Olympics 2020, where the team finished 4th place.

References 

2001 births
Living people
South Korean women's volleyball players
Volleyball players at the 2020 Summer Olympics
Olympic volleyball players of South Korea